The Catholic church in Finland (where the state church is Lutheran) and its insular dependency has a tiny Latin hierarchy, comprising no ecclesiastical province nor belonging to any (all sees being exempt, i.e. directly subject to the Holy See), and has no national episcopal conference, but the tiny Finnish episcopate partakes in the Episcopal conference of Scandinavia.

The only proper see is Latin: a full bishopric in the national capital Roman Catholic Diocese of Helsinki.

The Eastern Catholics are pastorally served by a transnational apostolic exarchate from Germany. There are no pre-diocesan or other Latin exempt jurisdictions.

There formally is also an Apostolic Nunciature to Finland, as papal embassy-level diplomatic representation, but it is vested in the Apostolic Nunciature to Sweden (in Djursholm), as are the nunciatures to Denmark, Norway and Iceland, covering the Nordic countries.

Current jurisdictions

Latin jurisdictions 
 Roman Catholic Diocese of Helsinki, which also covers Åland

Eastern Catholic jurisdiction 
''Ukrainian Catholic Church (Byzantine rite in Ukrainian language)

 Ukrainian Catholic Apostolic Exarchate in Germany and Scandinavia, also covering Germany (with the see in Münich), Denmark, Norway and Sweden

Defunct jurisdictions 
No titular sees

Pre-Reformation Latin 
 Roman Catholic Diocese of Åbo (Turku)

Post-Reformation 
Only Apostolic Vicariate of Finland, the direct precursors of the current Latin see.

See also 
 List of Catholic dioceses (structured view)

Sources and external links 
 GCatholic - data for all sections
 Catholic-hierarchy.org - embryonic

Lists of Roman Catholic dioceses by country
List of Catholic dioceses in Finland
Catholic dioceses